Allen Bryant Jr. (March 29, 1918 – March 22, 1992), nicknamed "Lefty", was an American Negro league pitcher who played between 1937 and 1946. 

A native of Chicago, Illinois, Bryant attended Lincoln High School in Kansas City, Missouri. He made his Negro league debut in 1937 for the Memphis Red Sox, and went on to play for the Kansas City Monarchs in 1940 and 1941. 

Bryant served as a sergeant in the US Army in World War II. After returning from his service, he again twirled for both Memphis and Kansas City in 1946, and later played minor league baseball in Canada. Bryant died in Kansas City in 1992 at age 73.

References

External links
 and Seamheads

1918 births
1992 deaths
Kansas City Monarchs players
Memphis Red Sox players
United States Army personnel of World War II
African Americans in World War II
United States Army non-commissioned officers
Baseball pitchers
African-American United States Army personnel